Events in the year 2019 in Botswana.

Incumbents
 President: Mokgweetsi Masisi 
 Vice President: Slumber Tsogwane

Events
 June 11 - Expression on being any LGBT sexuality is decriminalized

October – Scheduled date for the 2019 Botswana general election

Deaths

25 January – Boniface Tshosa Setlalekgosi, Roman Catholic prelate, Bishop of Gaborone (b. 1927).

References

 
2010s in Botswana
Years of the 21st century in Botswana
Botswana
Botswana